Environmental migrants are people who are forced to leave their home region due to sudden or long-term changes to their local or regional environment. These changes compromise their well-being or livelihood, and include increased drought, desertification, sea level rise, and disruption of seasonal weather patterns (such as monsoons[1]). Though there is no uniform, clear-cut definition of environmental migration, the idea is gaining attention as policy-makers and environmental and social scientists attempt to conceptualize the potential social effects of climate change and other environmental degradation, such a deforestation or overexploitation.

"Environmental migrant" and "climate migrant" (or "climate refugee") are used somewhat interchangeably with a range of similar terms, such as ecological refugee, environmental refugee, forced environmental migrant, environmentally motivated migrant, environmentally displaced person (EDP), disaster refugee, environmental displacee, eco-refugee, ecologically displaced person, or environmental-refugee-to-be (ERTB). The distinctions between these terms remain contested.

Definition and concept 
The vast majority of people fleeing environmental distress migrate over short distances, often temporarily. Moreover, the refugees aren't leaving their homes because of fear they will be persecuted, or because of "generalized violence or events seriously disturbing public order." Even though the definition of who is a refugee was expanded since its first international and legally binding definition in 1951 people who are forced to flee due to environmental change are still not offered the same legal protection as refugees.

The term "environmental refugee" was first proposed by Lester Brown in 1976. The International Organization for Migration (IOM) proposes the following definition for environmental migrants:
"Environmental migrants are persons or groups of persons who, for compelling reasons of sudden or progressive changes in the environment that adversely affect their lives or living conditions, are obliged to leave their habitual homes, or choose to do so, either temporarily or permanently, and who move either within their country or abroad."

Climate migrants are a subset of environmental migrants who were forced to flee "due to sudden or gradual alterations in the natural environment related to at least one of three impacts of climate change: sea-level rise, extreme weather events, and drought and water scarcity."

Types
The International Organisation for Migration proposes three types of environmental migrants:
Environmental emergency migrants: people who flee temporarily due to an environmental disaster or sudden environmental event. (Examples: someone forced to leave due to a hurricane, tsunami, earthquake, etc.)
Environmental forced migrants: people who have to leave due to deteriorating environmental conditions. (Example: someone forced to leave due to a slow deterioration of their environment such as deforestation, coastal deterioration, etc. The village of Satabhaya in the Kendrapara district of Odisha in India is “one of the foremost victims of coastal erosion and submergence due to rising sea levels”. The villagers were losing their homes to the encroaching sea and their cultivable lands to saline ingress, and were forced to migrate elsewhere. In Nepal, many villages in mass migration has been reported from Sivalik Hills / Chure regions due to water scarcity. Similarly, in eastern highland of Nepal 10 households in Chainpur, Sankhuwasabha, 25 households in Dharmadevi and 10 households in Panchkhapan have been forced to migrate due to water crises in their areas. 
Environmental motivated migrants also known as environmentally induced economic migrants: people who choose to leave to avoid possible future problems. (Example: someone who leaves due to declining crop productivity caused by desertification. A study conducted between 2014 and 2018 reveals that a large proportion of the deltaic populations of Volta delta in Africa, the Ganges Brahmaputra Meghna delta in Bangladesh and India, and Mahanadi delta in India cited economic reasons as a cause of their migration and only 2.8% cited environment reasons. But one third of migrant households perceived an increased exposure to environmental hazards and deltaic populations associated environmental factors with more insecure livelihoods. This shows how the environment is having a proximate effect on migration.)

Other scholars have proposed various other types of migrant including:

 Pressured environmental migrants – slow onset This type of migrant is displaced from their environment when an event is predicted prior to when it would be imperative for the inhabitants to leave. Such events could be desertification or prolonged drought, where the people of the region are no longer able to maintain farming or hunting to provide a hospitable living environment.

Imperative environmental migrants – gradual onset These are migrants that have been or will be "permanently displaced" from their homes due to environmental factors beyond their control.

Temporary environmental migrants – short term, sudden onset- This includes migrants suffering from a single event (i.e. Hurricane Katrina). This does not go to say that their status of being temporary is any less severe than that of the other, it simply means that they are able to go back to the place they fled from (though it may be undesirable to do so) granted that they are able to rebuild what was broken, and go on to maintain a similar quality of life to the one prior to the natural disaster. This type of migrant is displaced from their home state when their environment rapidly changes. They are displaced when disastrous events occur, such as tsunamis, hurricanes, tornadoes, and other natural disasters occur.

Global statistics 

There have been a number of attempts over the decades to enumerate environmental migrants and refugees. Jodi Jacobson (1988) is cited as the first researcher to enumerate the issue, stating that there were already up to 10 million 'Environmental Refugees'. Drawing on 'worst-case scenarios' about sea-level rise, she argued that all forms of 'Environmental Refugees' would be six times as numerous as political refugees. By 1989, Mustafa Tolba, Executive Director of United Nations Environment Programme, was claiming that 'as many as 50 million people could become environmental refugees' if the world did not act to support sustainable development.

In the mid-1990s, British environmentalist, Norman Myers, became the most prominent proponent of this 'maximalist' school (Suhrke 1993), noting that "environmental refugees will soon become the largest group of involuntary refugees". Additionally, he stated that there were 25 million environmental refugees in the mid-1990s, further claiming that this figure could double by 2010, with an upper limit of 200 million by 2050 (Myers 1997). Myers argued that the causes of environmental displacement would include desertification, lack of water, salination of irrigated lands and the depletion of biodiversity. He also hypothesised that displacement would amount to 30m in China, 30m in India, 15m in Bangladesh, 14m in Egypt, 10m in other delta areas and coastal zones, 1m in island states, and with otherwise agriculturally displaced people totalling 50m by 2050. More recently, Myers has suggested that the figure by 2050 might be as high as 250 million.

Norman Myers is the most cited researcher in this field, who found that 25 million environmental migrants existed in 1995 in his work (Myers & Kent 1995), which drew upon over 1000 sources. However, Vikram Kolmannskog has stated that Myers' work can be 'criticized for being inconsistent, impossible to check and failing to take proper account of opportunities to adapt' (2008: 9). Furthermore, Myers himself has acknowledged that his figures are based upon 'heroic extrapolation' (Brown 2008: 12). More generally, Black has argued that there is 'surprisingly little scientific evidence' that indicates that the world is 'filling-up with environmental refugees' (1998: 23).

Society and culture

Popular culture 
The notion of 'environmental migrant' has been a part of popular culture at least since The Grapes of Wrath, a 1939 novel by John Steinbeck.

Documentary films 
 Eco Migrants: The Case of Bhola Island (2013), documentary movie directed by Susan Stein. Starring Katherine Jacobsen, Nancy Schneider, Bogumil Terminski
 Refugees of the Blue Planet (2006), documentary movie directed by Hélène Choquette & Jean-Philippe Duval.
 The Land Between (2014) documentary movie directed by David Fedele.

See also

References

Further reading 
 Bogumil Terminski, Environmentally-Induced Displacement. Theoretical Frameworks and Current Challenges, CEDEM, University of Liège, 2012.

External links
 World Refugee & Migration Council (2021) 'Solutions for the Global Governance of Climate Displacement'
 

Environmental issues
Refugees by type
Globalization